Mikhail Alekseevich Lavrentyev (or Lavrentiev) (November 19, 1900 – October 15, 1980) was a Soviet mathematician and hydrodynamicist.

Early years
Lavrentiev was born in Kazan, where his father was an instructor at a college (he later became a professor at Kazan University, then Moscow University).

Lavrentiev entered Kazan University, and, when his family moved to Moscow in 1921, he transferred to the Department of Physics and Mathematics of Moscow University. He graduated in 1922. He continued his studies in the university in 1923-26 as a graduate student of  Nikolai Luzin.

Although Luzin was alleged to plagiarize in science and indulge in anti-Sovietism by some of his students in 1936, Lavrentiev did not participate in the notorious political persecution of his teacher which is known as the Luzin case or Luzin affair. In fact Luzin was a friend of his father.

Mid career
In 1927 Lavrentiev spent half a year in France, collaborating with French mathematicians, and upon returned took up a position with Moscow University.  Later he became a member of the staff of the Steklov Institute.  His main contributions relate to conformal mappings and partial differential equations.   Mstislav Keldysh was one of his students.

In 1939 Alexander A. Bogomolets, the president of the Ukrainian Academy of Sciences, asked Lavrentev  become director of the Institute of Mathematics at Kyiv

One of Lavrentiev's scientific interests was the physics of explosive processes, in which he had become involved when doing defense work during World War II.  A better understanding of the physics of explosions made it possible to use controlled explosions in construction, the best-known example being the construction of the Medeu Mudflow Control Dam outside of Almaty in Kazakhstan.

In Siberia
Mikhail Lavrentiev was one of the main organizers and the first Chairman of the Siberian Division of the Russian Academy of Sciences (in his time the Academy of Sciences of the USSR) from its founding in 1957 to 1975. The foundation of the Siberia's "Academic Town" Akademgorodok (now a district of Novosibirsk) remains his most widely known achievement.

Six months after the decision to found the Siberian Division of the USSR Academy of Sciences Novosibirsk State University was established. The Decree of the Council of Ministers of the USSR was signed January 9, 1958. From 1959 to 1966 he was a professor at Novosibirsk State University.

Lavrentyev was also a founder of the Institute of Hydrodynamics of the Siberian Division of the Russian Academy of Sciences which since 1980 has been named after Lavrentiev.

Lavrentiev was awarded the honorary title of Hero of the Socialist Labour, a Lenin Prize and USSR State Prize, and a Lomonosov Gold Medal. He was elected a member of several world-renowned  academies, and an honorable citizen of Novosibirsk.

Mikhail A. Lavrentiev's son, also named Mikhail (Mikhail M. Lavrentiev, 1930-2010), also became a mathematician and was a member of the leadership of Akademgorodok.

Eponyms 
 Street in Kazan
 Street in Dolgoprudny
Academician Lavrentyev Avenue in Novosibirsk
Lavrentyev Institute of Hydrodynamics in Novosibirsk
SESC affiliated with NSU
Novosibirsk Lavrentyev Lyceum 130
RV Akademik Lavrentyev
Aiguilles in Altai and Pamir

References

External links 
 
 
 Mikhail Lavrentiev's biography, at the site of Lavrentiev Hydrodynamics Institute. 

Soviet mathematicians
Soviet physicists
Academic staff of the Moscow Institute of Physics and Technology
Academic staff of the Steklov Institute of Mathematics
Mathematicians from Kazan
Scientists from Novosibirsk
Moscow State University alumni
Heroes of Socialist Labour
Members of the National Academy of Sciences of Ukraine
Full Members of the USSR Academy of Sciences
1900 births
1980 deaths
Academic staff of the D. Mendeleev University of Chemical Technology of Russia
Members of the German Academy of Sciences at Berlin
Second convocation members of the Verkhovna Rada of the Ukrainian Soviet Socialist Republic
NASU Institute of Mathematics
Lavrentyev
Central Aerohydrodynamic Institute employees